Coeloptera gyrobathra is a species of moth of the family Tortricidae. It is found in Australia, where it has been recorded from Queensland.

The wingspan is about 21 mm. The forewings are pale brown, with a whitish costal edge with fine short fuscous strigulae (fine streaks). The hindwings are grey.

References

Archipini
Moths described in 1925
Moths of Australia
Taxa named by Alfred Jefferis Turner